Yared Abetew (born 15 June 1999), is an Australian professional soccer player who plays as a defender for National Premier Leagues Victoria club Green Gully.

Club career

Adelaide United
On 20 October 2019, Abetew made his debut in the A-League, against Melbourne City in a 2–1 loss which involved an ankle injury forcing him substituting off at half-time. At age 21, he was promoted to the senior squad for the 2020–21 A-League season on 28 December 2020.

Career statistics

Club

References

External links

1999 births
Living people
Australian soccer players
Soccer players from Adelaide
Association football defenders
Croydon Kings players
Adelaide United FC players
National Premier Leagues players
A-League Men players
FK Beograd (Australia) players